This is a list of Members of Parliament (MPs) elected to the Convention Parliament of 1689 which transferred the crowns of England, Scotland and Ireland from James II to William III. The speaker was Henry Powle.
The Parliament first met on 22 January 1689 (but officially 13 February 1689) and lasted until  it was dissolved on 23 February 1690.

List of constituencies and members

See also
List of MPs elected to the English parliament in 1597
The Golden Speech

17th-century English parliaments
1689 in England
1689 in politics
1689